The following is an episode list for the Disney animated television series TaleSpin. The majority of the series and storylines are stand-alones and bear little significance in the order they are aired. The only recurrent themes are Baloo's drive to save money in order to repurchase his plane (the Sea Duck) and Rebecca's desire to make a profitable living. As with many animated series of the time, there was no formal conclusion to the series. A comic ran for a short period and was then discontinued as well.

Select episodes were first aired on The Disney Channel in the spring of 1990, as a preview for the series; these episodes' Disney Channel airdates are given separately.

Episodes

References

TaleSpin
Lists of Disney Channel television series episodes
Episodes